The Republic of Salé was a city state at Salé (modern Morocco), during the 17th century. Located at the mouth of the Bou Regreg river, it was founded by Moriscos from the town of Hornachos, in Western Spain. Moriscos were the descendants of Muslims who were nominally converted to Christianity, and were subject to mass deportation during the Spanish Inquisition. The Republic's main commercial activities were the Barbary slave trade and piracy during its brief existence in the 17th century. The city is now part of Morocco.

History

Arrival of the Moriscos 

The republic traces its origins back to the beginning of the 17th century, with the arrival of approximately 3,000 wealthy Moriscos from Hornachos in western Spain, who anticipated the 1609 expulsion edicts ordered by Philip III of Spain. After 1609, approximately 10,000 down-and-out expelled Moriscos arrived from Spain. Cultural and language differences between the native Saletin people and the Morisco refugees led the newcomers to settle in the old medina of Rabat, on the opposite bank of the Bou Regreg.

Pirates based on the western bank thrived and expanded their operations throughout the Mediterranean and the Atlantic Ocean. In 1624, the Dutchman Jan Janszoon (also known as Murad Reis) became the "Grand Admiral" and President of the Corsair Republic of Salé.

Independence

After Janszoon left Salé in 1627, the Moriscos ceased to recognize the authority of the Sultan Zidan al-Nasir, and refused to pay his tithe on their incomes. They proclaimed a Republic, ruled by a council or Diwan, a sort of government cabinet formed by 12 to 14 notable people whose members annually elected a Governor and a Captain General of the Fortalesa during the month of May. In the early years of the republic (between 1627 and 1630), the Diwan was controlled only by Hornacheros, whose grip on power was resented by the growing population of non-Hornachero Moriscos, called Andalusians. After bloody clashes in 1630, an agreement was reached: the election of a  Qaid by Andalusians and a new Diwan of 16 members of whom 8 were Andalusians and 8 Hornacheros.

In 1641 the Zaouia of Dila, which controlled much of Morocco, imposed a religious hegemony over Salé and its parent republic. By the early 1660s the republic was embroiled in civil war with the zawiya, and eventually Sultan Al-Rashid of Morocco of the Alaouite dynasty, which still rules Morocco into the 21st century, seized Rabat and Salé, ending its independence. It ended up under the control of the Sultan of Morocco after 1668, when Moulay al Rashid finally vanquished the Dilaites.

Piracy
According to the report of Father Pierre Dan in his "Histoire de Barbarie et de ses corsaires" ("History of Barbary and its corsairs") written in 1637, piracy in Salé began with the arrival of Moors [Moriscos] from Spain, whose wealth allowed them to acquire some ships. With them they traveled the seas, approaching mainly Spanish ships, giving 10% of their loot (both riches and captives) to the Saadiens, before they successfully rebelled against his authority.

In popular culture
The character Robinson Crusoe, in Daniel Defoe's novel of the same name, spends time in captivity of the local pirates and at last sails off to liberty from the mouth of the Salé river.

The anarchist writer Peter Lamborn Wilson devotes to the Republic of Salé a major part of his 1995 book Pirate Utopias: Moorish Corsairs & European Renegadoes. In Wilson's view, such pirate enclaves as Salé were early forms of autonomous proto-anarchist societies in that they operated beyond the reach of governments and embraced unrestricted political freedom.

See also
Thalassocracy

References

Bibliography
  Leïla Maziane, « Salé et ses corsaires, 1666-1727: un port de course marocain au XVIIe siècle », Publication Université de Rouen Havre, 2007
  Pierre Dan, Histoire de Barbarie et de ses corsaires, Pierre Rocolet, 1649
  Roger Coindreau, « Les Corsaires de Salé », La Croisée des chemins, 2006 (orig. ed. 1948)

States and territories established in 1627
States and territories disestablished in the 1660s
17th century in Morocco
17th-century pirates
Moriscos
Piracy in the Atlantic Ocean
Barbary pirates
Pirate dens and locations
Republicanism in Morocco
1627 establishments in Africa
Republic
City-states